Yatin Karyekar  is a veteran Indian actor in the Bollywood film industry. He was also part of long running television serial Shanti. He appeared in the role of Aurangzeb in popular Marathi serial Raja Shivchhatrapati.

Early life

He was earlier married to Iravati Harshe.

Filmography

Films

 Katha (1983)
 Qayamat Se Qayamat Tak (1988)
Sarkarnama (1998)
 Hanuman (1998)
 Hey Ram (2000)
 Munnabhai M.B.B.S. (2003)
 Vasool Raja MBBS (Tamil in 2004)
 Iqbal (2005)
 Kalyug (2005)
 Alag (2006)
 Eik Dasttak (2007)
 Zindagi Tere Naam (2008)
 Bombay To Bangkok (2008)
 Aao Wish Karein (2009)
 The Hangman (2010)
 Karthik Calling Karthik (2010)
 Soundtrack (2011)
 Monica (2011)
 Love U...Mr. Kalakaar! (2011) as Israni
 Lanka (2011)
 Rakhtbeej (2012)
 Khoon Toh Hona Hi Tha (2013)
 Vitti Dandu (2014)
 Meinu Ek Ladki Chaahiye (2014)
 Kaay Raav Tumhi (2015)
 Karbonn (2015)
 Daagdi Chaawl (2015)
 Bajirao Mastani (2015)
 Love Story Majhi Aani Tichi (2016) as Dr sudhir Sarpodhar
 Sargam (Marathi Movie in 2016)
 Rockey (2017)
 Khopa (2017)
 Nani Bai Ro Mayro (Rajasthani Movie in 2017)
 Reva (Gujarati in 2018)
 PM Narendra Modi (2019)
Girlfriend (2019) Marathi film
 A1 (Tamil film in 2019)
 The Warrior Queen of Jhansi (English in 2019)
 Jhalki (2019)
 The Battle of Bhima Koregaon (film) (2021)

Television

Web series

See also

List of Indian film actors

References

External links
 
Yatin Karyekar's Interview recorded by Camaal Mustafa Sikander for Latin & Ballroom Dance Choreographer Daniel Ibess Clifford

Indian male film actors
Living people
Marathi people
Indian male television actors
1946 births